Maciej Małecki (Warsaw, 27 November 1940) is a Polish composer and pianist.

He studied at the Frederic Chopin Academy of Music (graduating 1965) and the Eastman School of Music, Rochester, New York. From 1993 to 1996 he was president of the Polish Composers' Association.

Selected works
 Cicha noc - Silent night, symphony of Polish carols. - recording Carus, Germany.

References

1940 births
Living people
Polish composers
Musicians from Warsaw
Chopin University of Music alumni
Eastman School of Music alumni